Haley Danita Anderson (born November 20, 1991) is an American competitive swimmer who is an Olympic silver medalist.  She placed second in the 10-kilometer open water event at the 2012 Summer Olympics.

Personal
Anderson's older sister, Alyssa, was a swimmer at Arizona.  Both sisters competed at the 2009 World Aquatics Championships.

Anderson attended the University of Southern California, where she swam for the USC Trojans swimming and diving team in National Collegiate Athletic Association (NCAA) competition from 2010 to 2013.

Career
At the 2009 Junior Pan Pacific Championships, Anderson placed first in the 800-meter and 1,500-meter freestyle events.

At the 2009 USA Nationals and World Championship Trials, Anderson placed second in the 800-meter freestyle in 8:31.66, earning a place to compete at the 2009 World Aquatics Championships in Rome. At the World Championships, Anderson placed 28th in the 800-meter freestyle (8:45.91) and ninth in the 1,500-meter freestyle (16:20.62).

In June 2012, Anderson qualified for the 2012 Summer Olympics by placing first at the FINA Olympic Marathon Swim Qualifier in Setubal in the 10-kilometer open water event.  Anderson later competed at the 2012 United States Olympic Trials in the hopes of also competing in the pool but narrowly missed the team by finishing third in the 800-meter freestyle.  She also competed in the 400-meter individual medley and placed eighth in the final.

At the 2012 Olympics in London, Anderson earned a silver medal by placing second in the 10-kilometer marathon event, finishing four-tenths (0.40) of a second behind the winner, Éva Risztov of Hungary, over the 6.2 miles of the event. Her sister Alyssa earned a gold medal at the 2012 Olympics as a member of the winning U.S. team in the 4x200-meter freestyle relay.

At the 15th FINA World Championships in Barcelona in 2013, Anderson won the gold medal in the 5-kilometer open water competition.

At the AT&T Winter Nationals located in Federal Way, WA, Anderson won first in both the women's 800-meter freestyle and the women's 200-meter butterfly.

At the 2015 World Championships in Kazan, she retained her 5km open water title.

In 2019, she won silver in the 10 km open water race at the World Championships.

Personal bests (long course)

See also

List of Olympic medalists in swimming (women)
List of University of Southern California people
USC Trojans

References

External links
 
 
 
 
 
 
 

1991 births
Living people
American female freestyle swimmers
Olympic silver medalists for the United States in swimming
Sportspeople from Santa Clara, California
Swimmers at the 2012 Summer Olympics
Swimmers at the 2016 Summer Olympics
Swimmers at the 2020 Summer Olympics
USC Trojans women's swimmers
Medalists at the 2012 Summer Olympics
Female long-distance swimmers
World Aquatics Championships medalists in open water swimming
Universiade medalists in swimming
Universiade gold medalists for the United States
Universiade silver medalists for the United States
Medalists at the 2011 Summer Universiade
20th-century American women
21st-century American women